Walter Haag (1898–1978) was a German art director. He worked on more than sixty films during his career including the 1940 historical melodrama The Heart of a Queen.

Selected filmography
 The Private Life of Louis XIV (1935)
 The Abduction of the Sabine Women (1936)
 When the Cock Crows (1936)
 The Heart of a Queen (1940)
 The Gasman (1941)
 Wedding in Barenhof (1942)
 The Great Love (1942)
 Between Heaven and Earth (1942)
 Back Then (1943)
 Keepers of the Night (1949)
 Amico (1949)
 My Niece Susanne (1950)
 A Day Will Come (1950)
 Doctor Praetorius (1950)
 Immortal Beloved (1951)
 The Day Before the Wedding (1952)
 Beloved Life (1953)
 The Blue Hour (1953)
 His Royal Highness (1953)
 She (1954)
 Mamitschka (1955)
 Roses in Autumn (1955)
 Night of Decision (1956)
 The Glass Tower (1957)
 King in Shadow (1957)
 A Woman Who Knows What She Wants (1958)
 Father, Mother and Nine Children (1958)
 Nick Knatterton’s Adventure (1959)
Triplets on Board (1959)
 Of Course, the Motorists (1959)
 The Last Pedestrian (1960)

References

Bibliography
 Hull, David Stewart. Film in the Third Reich: A Study of the German Cinema, 1933-1945. University of California Press, 1969.

External links

1898 births
1978 deaths
German art directors
Film people from Berlin